Monica Seles was the defending champion, but did not compete this year.

Unseeded Jill Craybas won the title by defeating Silvija Talaja 2–6, 6–4, 6–4 in the final. It was the 1st title for Craybas in her singles career.

Seeds
The first two seeds received a bye into the second round.

Draw

Finals

Top half

Bottom half

References
 Tournament Profile (ITF)

Singles